Kuchesar was a Zamindari Estate of Dalal Jats during the British Raj. It is situated off the NH 24 in what is now of Bulandshahr district, Uttar Pradesh, India,  from Delhi.

Part of the Kuchesar Fort, built 1734, became a heritage hotel in 1998, after its restoration by Neemrana Hotels.

Kuchesar Estate

Mughal era
By 1790, Ramdhan Singh had recaptured all of Kuchesar estate; he had also acquired Pooth, Siana, Thana Farida, Datyane and Saidpur on Rs 40,000 annual Malguzari lease from the ruler of Delhi Shah Alam II. After 1782, Kuchesar mud-fort remained in unbroken possession of the family; it was granted to them in perpetual lease by the Mughal Emperor Shah Alam II in 1790, a grant confirmed by the British in 1807.

British era
The British formalised their authority over the area in 1803; they recognised the estate of Kuchesar and its estate-holders without alteration to the status quo. Kuchesar State, which was obtained by Rao Randhan Singh Dalal as perpetual jagir from Mughal Emperor Shah Alam II (ruled 1759–1806) for an annual payment of Rs. 40,000, was later confirmed to him by British. Randhan Singh died in prison in Meerut in 1816, and his jagir was granted revenue-free by in perpetuity to his son Rao Fateh Singh by the British Raj Lord Moira in 1816.

Rao Fateh Singh died in 1839 and his son Rao Bahadur Singh added to his estate. He wanted to leave his estate equally to his two sons, Gulab Singh and Umarao Singh, but Gulab Singh resented it and Umarao Singh was found murdered in his house in 1847.

Gulab Singh inherited the estate for his services to British during Indian Rebellion of 1857. He had no sons, after he died in 1859 the estate was managed by his widow Rani Jaswant Kumari pending a settlement. Jaswant Kumari died quite soon afterwards, and was followed in these offices by Gulab Singh's only daughter, Bhup Kumari.

Bhup Kumari died without a child in 1861 and her husband Kushal Singh laid claim to the estate. Kushal Singh was a nephew and adopted son of Raja Nahar Singh of Ballabhgarh State. After Nahar's property was ceased by British and his estate was abolished for his participation in 1857 war of independence, a political pension of Rs. 6,000 a year was settled upon, Nahar's heir-apparent adopted son and nephew, Kushal Singh. Kushal left Ballabhgarh for good and sought shelter with his wife's people at Kuchesar. In 1868, the Panchyat court divided the estate into three parts: 
 share of 6/16 to Umrao Singh, he later gave his daughter to Kushal Singh
 share of 5/16's to Pratap Singh,
 remaining share of 5/16 to Khusal Singh.

Umrao Singh married one of his daughters to Kushal Singh, who bore him a son Giriraj Singh. In 1898, Umrao Singh died and his grandson and Kushal Singh's son, Rao Giriraj Singh, inherited the portion held by him as well as the portion held by Kushal Singh.

Chronology of estate-holders
The chronology of Kuchesar Jat estate-holders is as under:
 Kunwar Inderjit Singh (son of Rao Giriraj Singh from his first wife)
 Kunwar Sarjit Singh (Rao Giriraj Singh from his second wife)
 KunwarGurdyal Singh
 Kunwar Ajit Singh	
 Anant Jeet Singh (son of KunwarAjit Singh)
 AnekJit Singh (son of KunwarAjit Singh

References 

 Kuchesar at Google Maps

External links
 http://kuchesarfort.com/
 Kuchesar Promoters,

Quasi-princely estates of India
Villages in Bulandshahr district
History of Uttar Pradesh